Minton is a surname of British origin. It is a locational surname, named after Minton, Shropshire, which in Old English means "the settlement on the hill". The surname Minton may refer to:

Anna Minton (born 1970), British writer
John W. "Big John Studd" Minton (born 1948-1995), Professional Wrestler
Bob Minton (1946–2010), American banker
Chip Minton (born 1969), American bobsledder
Clive Minton (1934–2019), Australian ornithologist
Faith Minton (born 1957), American actress and stuntwoman
Greg Minton (born 1951), American baseball player
Gytte Minton (1901–1964), British fencer
Henry A. Minton (1883–1948), American architect
Henry Collin Minton (1855–1924), American theologian
Jeff Minton (born 1973), British football player
John D. Minton Jr. (born 1952), American judge
John Minton (artist) (1917–1957), British painter
Mark C. Minton (born 1944), American diplomat
Phil Minton (born 1940), British musician
Rachel Minton (born 1980), American musician
Reggie Minton (born 1941), American basketball coach
Rick Minton (born 1950), American politician
Sherman A. Minton (1919–1999), American scientist
Sherman Minton (1890–1965), American politician and judge
Robert Minton (1904–1974), American bobsledder
Roy Minton, British playwright
Thomas Minton (1765–1836), British potter
Tom Minton (born 1954), American animator and artist
Yvonne Minton (born 1938), Australian opera singer

See also
Manton (disambiguation)
Mountain (surname)

Surnames of British Isles origin